The 2020–21 Liga III was the 65th season of Liga III, the third tier of the Romanian football league system. The season began in September 2020 and ended in May 2021.

The format was changed from five series of 16 teams to ten series of 10 teams, as the no relegation rule was applied in the previous season after its suspension due to the COVID-19 pandemic.



Team changes

To Liga III
Promoted from Liga IV
 Bradu Borca  (debut)
 Dante Botoșani   (debut)
 Satu Mare  (debut)
 Progresul Șomcuta Mare   (after 18 years of absence)
 Unirea Ungheni  (after 8 years of absence)
 Corona Brașov  (after 8 years of absence)
 Progresul Ezeriș    (debut)
 Avântul Periam   (debut)
 Petrolul Potcoava  (debut)
 Oltenița  (after 1 year of absence)
 Steaua București  (debut)
 Sportul Chiscani  (after 1 year of absence)
 Gloria Albești  (debut)
 Plopeni  (after 8 years of absence)
 Avântul Valea Mărului  (after 2 years of absence)
 Râmnicu Sărat  (after 1 year of absence)
 Ocna Mureș  (after 1 year of absence)
 Sporting Vaslui (after 17 years of absence)
 Măgura Cisnădie  (after 4 years of absence)
 CA Oradea  (debut)
 Sportul Șimleu Silvaniei  (after 11 years of absence)
 Jiul Petroșani  (after 8 years of absence)
 Minerul Costești  (debut)
 Someșul Dej  (debut)
 Sepsi OSK II  (debut)

Relegated from Liga II
 Sportul Snagov  (after 8 years of absence)
 Daco-Getica București  (after 4 years of absence)

From Liga III
Relegated to Liga IV
 Botoșani II  (ended 2-year stay)
 CSU Galați  (ended 1-year stay)
 Poseidon Limanu-2 Mai  (ended 1-year stay)
 Medgidia  (ended 2-year stay)
 Tractorul Cetate  (ended 1-year stay) 
 Național Sebiș  (ended 12-year stay)
 CFR II Cluj  (ended 3-year stay)

Promoted to Liga II
 Aerostar Bacău  (ended 1-year stay)
 FC U Craiova  (ended 2-year stay)
 Unirea Slobozia (ended 5-year stay)
 CSM Slatina (ended 1-year stay)
 Comuna Recea (ended 5-year stay)

Excluded teams
Sportul Snagov and Daco-Getica București were dissolved and excluded by the Romanian Football Federation before the start of the new season.

Teams spared from relegation
Hușana Huși, CSM Bacău, Pașcani, Axiopolis Cernavodă, Dacia Unirea Brăila, FCSB II, Recolta Gheorghe Doja, Pucioasa, Astra II, Balotești, Sporting Roșiori, Cetate Deva, Filiași, ACS Poli Timișoara, Gilortul Târgu Cărbunești, Unirea Alba Iulia, Industria Galda, Odorheiu Secuiesc and SCM Zalău were spared from relegation due to the interruption of the 2019–20 season, as a result of the COVID-19 pandemic.

Renamed teams and other changes
Cetate Deva was renamed as CSM Deva.

Metalurgistul Cugir was renamed as CSO Cugir.

Other teams
Viitorul II Constanța, Dinamo II București, Rapid II București, Concordia II Chiajna, Academica II Clinceni, Gaz Metan II Mediaș, Hermannstadt II and Kids Tâmpa Brașov were enrolled directly in the Liga III.

League tables

Seria I

Seria II

Seria III

Seria IV

Seria V

Seria VI

Seria VII

Seria VIII

Seria IX

Seria X

Promotion play-offs
In this season a new format was adopted, due to COVID-19 pandemic. The 100 football clubs were placed in 10 series, the first two teams from each series qualified for the promotion play-off, but only the best 5 teams promoted to 2021–22 Liga II season.

First round

Second round

Relegation play-outs
In this season a new format was adopted, due to COVID-19 pandemic. The 100 football clubs were placed in 10 series, the last two teams from each series and the worst 8th place qualified for the relegation play-outs, which was played against 21 winners of the 2020–21 Liga IV season. Only the winners of the 21 encounters will continue in the 2021–22 Liga III.

|-
|colspan="3" style="background-color:#ffcccc"|Region 1
|colspan="2" style="background-color:#ffcccc"|
||w/o||w/o
||2–1||5–0
||2–0||2–1
|-
|colspan="3" style="background-color:#ffcccc"|Region 2
|colspan="2" style="background-color:#ffcccc"|
{{OneLegResult| Team Săgeata (BZ) ||2–5| (L3) Avântul Valea Mărului }}||1–3||1–2
||w/o||w/o
{{OneLegResult| Făurei (L3) ||2–2| (IL) Fetești }}||2–2||0–0
|-
|colspan="3" style="background-color:#ffcccc"|Region 3
|colspan="2" style="background-color:#ffcccc"|
||0–3||4–1
{{OneLegResult| Rapid Buzescu (TR) ||0–5| (L3) Recolta Gheorghe Doja }}||0–3||0–2
||1–1||2–2
|-
|colspan="3" style="background-color:#ffcccc"|Region 4
|colspan="2" style="background-color:#ffcccc"|
{{OneLegResult| Balotești (L3) ||0–6| (AG) Real Bradu }}||0–2||0–4
||3–1||3–1
{{OneLegResult| Băbeni (VL) ||3–11| (L3) Kids Tâmpa Brașov }}||3–4||0–7
|-
|colspan="3" style="background-color:#ffcccc"|Region 5
|colspan="2" style="background-color:#ffcccc"|
{{OneLegResult| Universitatea II Craiova (L3) ||1–3| (CS) Voința Lupac }}||1–0||0–3
{{OneLegResult| Dunărea Calafat (DJ) ||1–4| (L3) Progresul Ezeriș }}||1–1||0–3
||2–1||3–4
|-
|colspan="3" style="background-color:#ffcccc"|Region 6
|colspan="2" style="background-color:#ffcccc"|
{{OneLegResult| Industria Galda (L3) ||1–2| (TM) Pobeda Star Bisnov}}||0–0||1–2
{{OneLegResult| Hermannstadt II (L3) ||4–5| (AR) Frontiera Curtici}}||1–2||3–3
||3–1||2–2
|-
|colspan="3" style="background-color:#ffcccc"|Region 7
|colspan="2" style="background-color:#ffcccc"|
{{OneLegResult| Rapid Jibou (SJ) ||4–7| (L3) Luceafărul Oradea}}||1–1||3–6
||3–0||5–4
||3–1||3–1
|}

References

2020
3
Romania